Physoderma leproides is a plant pathogen infecting beets.

See also 
 List of beet diseases

References

External links 
 Index Fungorum
 USDA ARS Fungal Database

Fungal plant pathogens and diseases
Food plant pathogens and diseases
Fungi described in 1950
Blastocladiomycota